Myung-hoon, also spelled Myung-hun, is a Korean masculine given name. Its meaning differs based on the hanja used to write each syllable of the name. There are 19 hanja with the reading "myung" and 12 hanja with the reading "hoon" on the South Korean government's official list of hanja which may be registered for use in given names.

People with this name include:
Myung-whun Chung (born 1953), South Korean pianist and conductor
Ri Myung-hun (born 1967), North Korean basketball player
Choi Myung-hoon (born 1975), South Korean professional Go player
Bae Myung-hoon (born 1978), South Korean science fiction writer
Chun Myung-hoon (born 1978), South Korean singer, member of NRG
Shin Myung-hoon (born 1981), South Korean amateur boxer
Lee Myung-hoon (actor) (born 1989), South Korean actor
Jung Myung-hoon (born 1991), South Korean StarCraft player

Fictional characters with this name include:
Shin Myung-hun, in 2008 South Korean television series East of Eden

See also
List of Korean given names

References

Korean masculine given names